Barbados competed at the 2000 Summer Olympics in Sydney, Australia.
The nation won its first ever Olympic medal at these Games.

Medalists

Athletics

Men
Track and road events

Women
Track and road events

Boxing

Men

Judo

Men

Sailing

Men

Shooting

Men

Swimming

Men

Women

See also
Barbados at the 1999 Pan American Games

References
Official Olympic Reports
International Olympic Committee results database

Nations at the 2000 Summer Olympics
2000
Summer Olympics